Li Wing-choi (born 19 August 1991) is a Hong Kong politician who represented Victoria Park on Wan Chai District Council for the Victoria Social Association from 2020 to 2021.

References

Living people
1991 births
District councillors of Wan Chai District
21st-century Hong Kong politicians
Hong Kong pan-democrats
Place of birth missing (living people)